Pallenis hierochuntica (common names include rose of Jericho and dinosaur plant) is a species of Pallenis that is notable for being a resurrection plant.

See also
 Anastatica hierochuntica

References

Inuleae
Resurrection plants
Flora of the Canary Islands